Zhongfang may refer to:

 Zhongfang County (中方县), a county in Hunan province, China.
 Zhongfang Town (中方镇), a town and the county seat of Zhongfang County, Hunan Province.
Zhongfang, Linxiang (忠防镇), a town of Linxiang city, Hunan Province.